City That Never Sleeps is a  1953 American film noir crime film directed by John H. Auer and starring Gig Young, Mala Powers, William Talman, Edward Arnold, Chill Wills, Marie Windsor, and Paula Raymond, with cinematography by John L. Russell.

Plot
The story begins with a voice-over by the "Voice of Chicago" introducing the world and the main characters of the film. There is Sally "Angel Face" Connors (Mala Powers), an exotic dancer in a nightclub; Gregg Warren (Wally Cassell), a former actor working as a performance artist in the nightclub window, a "Mechanical Man"; Johnny Kelly (Gig Young) a cop having an affair with Angel Face and struggling with his conscience whether to leave his wife; Penrod Biddel  (Edward Arnold), a successful and smooth crooked attorney; Hayes Stewart (William Talman), a magician who has turned to making a career as a pickpocket and then as a thief.

Officer Johnny Kelly is disillusioned with his job which he took to please his father, and writes a letter of resignation which he intends to hand in at the end of his shift. He calls Penrod Biddel to accept an employment offer that the lawyer had made, and agrees to meet him later that evening. Johnny's wife Kathy Kelly (Paula Raymond) discovers Johnny's plan to quit his job and calls his father Sgt. John Kelly Sr. (Otto Hulett) to ask him to intervene; Kelly Sr. is concerned for his son's happiness and has a talk with Johnny. On this night Johnny's regular partner calls in sick and his replacement is Sgt. Joe (Chill Wills) who doesn't give his surname and whose voice can be recognized as the introductory "Voice of Chicago". As they begin the nightly shift Sgt. Joe has plenty of homespun advice for Johnny, whose negative energy casts a pall on their working environment.

As the night progresses Johnny visits Angel Face to re-affirm their plans to go away. He also meets with the lawyer Penrod Biddel who asks Johnny to pick up Hayes Stewart and leave him across the state line for the Indiana Police to arrest and incarcerate. Johnny says no to this but changes his mind when Biddel tells him that Johnny's brother 'Stubby' (Ron Hagerthy) is associating with the criminal and will surely get into trouble unless Johnny steps in and does what Biddel wants. The lawyer pays Johnny $5,000 for the job, but it goes wrong and Stewart gets away, knowing Biddel is out to get him.

Johnny and Sgt. Joe answer a call for a woman having a baby and Johnny performs the delivery; they also answer a call for an illegal gambling game on the street, arresting the ring leader and giving the money back to the men who have been hoodwinked. After each call Sgt. Joe lays out another bit of wisdom that seemingly works to influence Johnny to re-evaluate his life.

Hayes Stewart has obtained incriminating evidence on Penrod Biddel and is having an affair with Biddel’s wife Lydia (Marie Windsor). Stewart shoots the lawyer and he and Lydia escape, running to the nightclub where Angel Face dances. Having discovered Biddel's agreement with Johnny to take him out of the state, Stewart calls the police asking to meet with Officer Kelly. Johnny's father takes the call and, mistaking the father for the son, Stewart shoots Kelly Sr., who dies in his son's arms.

Stewart takes Lydia and Stubby and escapes but can't get far because of the police closing in. He shoots Lydia dead in front of the nightclub window where the Mechanical Man is performing. He stays close by, unsure if the Mechanical Man is a real man or an automaton; if he is real he intends to kill him. Gregg Warren, the Mechanical Man, is in love with Angel Face, and thinks he can bait the killer for Johnny. This sense of honor, and his father's murder, makes clear to Johnny what he really holds valuable in his life. As Gregg Warren performs in the window, Angel Face declares her love for him causing the Mechanical Man to shed a tear. Hayes Stewart sees that he is indeed a real man and shoots, revealing his hideout. Stewart beats up Stubby. Johnny Kelly goes after Stewart and, after a chase along an elevated railroad track and a fight, Stewart is electrocuted on the live rail and falls to his death. Johnny considers what has happened this eventful night, re-evaluates his priorities in life, and is reconciled with his wife. The mysterious Sgt. Joe has disappeared.

Cast

 Gig Young as Johnny Kelly
 Mala Powers as Sally 'Angel Face' Connors
 William Talman as Hayes Stewart
 Edward Arnold as Penrod Biddel
 Chill Wills as Sgt. Joe, the 'Voice of Chicago'
 Marie Windsor as Lydia Biddel
 Paula Raymond as Kathy Kelly
 Otto Hulett as Sgt. John 'Pop' Kelly Sr.
 Wally Cassell as Gregg Warren
 Ron Hagerthy as Stubby Kelly
 James Andelin as Lt. Parker
 Tom Poston as Detective (billed as Thomas Poston)
 Bunny Kacher as Agnes DuBois
 Philip L. Boddy as Maitre d'Hotel 
 Thomas Jones as Fancy Dan
 Leonard Diebold as Cab Driver

Reception

Critical response
Film critic Craig Butler wrote, "City That Never Sleeps is an uneven crime drama, one that contains enough good elements that it's frustrating the film as a whole is not better. The chief culprit is, as so often, the screenplay, which starts out promisingly. Gig Young's character seems to be one that is fairly complex, a cop who is dissatisfied with his lot in life and could fall prey to temptation. Unfortunately, the character is not developed sufficiently beyond that, which is also the case with the Wally Cassell "mechanical man" character; he, too, shows promise that goes unfulfilled, although the sheer strangeness of his job does fascinate.

The staff at Variety magazine gave the film a mixed review, and wrote, "Production and direction loses itself occasionally in stretching for mood and nuances, whereas a straightline cops-and-robbers action flavor would have been more appropriate. Same flaw is found in the Steve Fisher screen original...John L. Russell's photography makes okay use of Chicago streets and buildings for the low-key, night-life effect required to back the melodrama.

In his Aug. 8, 1953 review in The New York Times, critic Howard Thompson called it a "routine crime melodrama," but singled out Wally Cassell's brief role as "truly fantastic" and William Talman as the cast's standout, "a truly fine performer."

21st Century Critical Reassessment
On February 3, 2018, director Martin Scorsese introduced a newly restored print of City That Never Sleeps as the opening film of a 30 movie retrospective of restored Republic Pictures that Scorsese curated to be exhibited at the Museum of Modern Art in New York City, citing the picture's blazing energy and brilliant creativity.

In February 2019 the film played at the Egyptian in Seattle, introduced by Eddie "Czar of Noir" Muller.

See also
 List of American films of 1953

References

External links
 
 
 
 
 
 

1953 films
1953 crime drama films
American crime drama films
American black-and-white films
1950s English-language films
Film noir
Republic Pictures films
Films directed by John H. Auer
Films set in Chicago
1950s American films